In enzymology, a mannitol dehydrogenase (cytochrome) is an enzyme that catalyzes the chemical reaction

D-mannitol + ferricytochrome c  D-fructose + ferrocytochrome c

Thus, the two substrates of this enzyme are D-mannitol and ferricytochrome c, whereas its two products are D-fructose and ferrocytochrome c.

This enzyme belongs to the family of oxidoreductases, to be specific those acting on the CH-OH group of donor with a cytochrome as acceptor. The systematic name of this enzyme class is D-mannitol:ferricytochrome-c 2-oxidoreductase. This enzyme is also called polyol dehydrogenase. This enzyme participates in pentose and glucuronate interconversions and fructose and mannose metabolism

References

 
 

EC 1.1.2
Enzymes of unknown structure